The ancient Aramaic alphabet was adapted by Arameans from the Phoenician alphabet and became a distinct script by the 8th century BC. It was used to write the Aramaic languages spoken by ancient Aramean pre-Christian tribes throughout the Fertile Crescent. It was also adopted by other peoples as their own alphabet when empires and their subjects underwent linguistic Aramaization during a language shift for governing purposes—a precursor to Arabization centuries later—including among Assyrians who permanently replaced their Akkadian language and its cuneiform script with Aramaic and its script, and among Jews (but not Samaritans), who adopted the Aramaic language as their vernacular and started using the Aramaic alphabet even for writing Hebrew, displacing the former Paleo-Hebrew alphabet. (The modern Hebrew alphabet derives from the Aramaic alphabet, in contrast to the modern Samaritan alphabet, which derives from Paleo-Hebrew). The letters in the Aramaic alphabet all represent consonants, some of which are also used as matres lectionis to indicate long vowels.

The Aramaic alphabet is historically significant since virtually all modern Middle Eastern writing systems can be traced back to it. That is primarily due to the widespread usage of the Aramaic language after it was adopted as both a lingua franca and the official language of the Neo-Assyrian and Neo-Babylonian Empires, and their successor, the Achaemenid Empire.

Among the descendant scripts in modern use, the Jewish Hebrew alphabet bears the closest relation to the Imperial Aramaic script of the 5th century BC, with an identical letter inventory and, for the most part, nearly identical letter shapes. By contrast the Samaritan Hebrew script is directly descended from Proto-Hebrew/Phoenician script, which was in turn the ancestor of the Aramaic alphabet. The Aramaic alphabet was also an ancestor to the Nabataean alphabet, which in turn had the Arabic alphabet as a descendant.

Writing systems (like the Aramaic) that indicate consonants but do not indicate most vowels other than by means of matres lectionis or added diacritical signs, have been called abjads by Peter T. Daniels to distinguish them from alphabets such as the Greek alphabet that represent vowels more systematically. The term was coined to avoid the notion that a writing system that represents sounds must be either a syllabary or an alphabet, which would imply that a system like Aramaic must be either a syllabary (as argued by Ignace Gelb) or an incomplete or deficient alphabet (as most other writers had said before Daniels). Rather, Daniels put forward, this is a different type of writing system, intermediate between syllabaries and 'full' alphabets.

Origins

The earliest inscriptions in the Aramaic language use the Phoenician alphabet. Over time, the alphabet developed into the form shown below. Aramaic gradually became the lingua franca throughout the Middle East, with the script at first complementing and then displacing Assyrian cuneiform, as the predominant writing system.

Achaemenid Empire (The First Persian Empire) 

Around 500 BC, following the Achaemenid conquest of Mesopotamia under Darius I, Old Aramaic was adopted by the Persians as the "vehicle for written communication between the different regions of the vast Persian empire with its different peoples and languages. The use of a single official language, which modern scholarship has dubbed as Official Aramaic, Imperial Aramaic or Achaemenid Aramaic, can be assumed to have greatly contributed to the astonishing success of the Achaemenid Persians in holding their far-flung empire together for as long as they did."

Imperial Aramaic was highly standardised; its orthography was based more on historical roots than any spoken dialect and was influenced by Old Persian. The Aramaic glyph forms of the period are often divided into two main styles, the "lapidary" form, usually inscribed on hard surfaces like stone monuments, and a cursive form whose lapidary form tended to be more conservative by remaining more visually similar to Phoenician and early Aramaic. Both were in use through the Achaemenid Persian period, but the cursive form steadily gained ground over the lapidary, which had largely disappeared by the 3rd century BC.

For centuries after the fall of the Achaemenid Empire in 331 BC, Imperial Aramaic, or something near enough to it to be recognisable, would remain an influence on the various native Iranian languages. The Aramaic script would survive as the essential characteristics of the Iranian Pahlavi writing system.

30 Aramaic documents from Bactria have been recently discovered, an analysis of which was published in November 2006. The texts, which were rendered on leather, reflect the use of Aramaic in the 4th century BC in the Persian Achaemenid administration of Bactria and Sogdiana.

The widespread usage of Achaemenid Aramaic in the Middle East led to the gradual adoption of the Aramaic alphabet for writing Hebrew. Formerly, Hebrew had been written using an alphabet closer in form to that of Phoenician, the Paleo-Hebrew alphabet.

Aramaic-derived scripts

Since the evolution of the Aramaic alphabet out of the Phoenician one was a gradual process, the division of the world's alphabets into the ones derived from the Phoenician one directly and the ones derived from Phoenician via Aramaic is somewhat artificial. In general, the alphabets of the Mediterranean region (Anatolia, Greece, Italy) are classified as Phoenician-derived, adapted from around the 8th century BC, and those of the East (the Levant, Persia, Central Asia and India) are considered Aramaic-derived, adapted from around the 6th century BC from the Imperial Aramaic script of the Achaemenid Empire.

After the fall of the Achaemenid Empire, the unity of the Imperial Aramaic script was lost, diversifying into a number of descendant cursives.

The Hebrew and Nabataean alphabets, as they stood by the Roman era, were little changed in style from the Imperial Aramaic alphabet. Ibn Khaldun (1332–1406) alleges that not only the old Nabataean writing was influenced by the "Syrian script" (i.e. Aramaic), but also the old Chaldean script.

A cursive Hebrew variant developed from the early centuries AD, but it remained restricted to the status of a variant used alongside the noncursive. By contrast, the cursive developed out of the Nabataean alphabet in the same period soon became the standard for writing Arabic, evolving into the Arabic alphabet as it stood by the time of the early spread of Islam.

The development of cursive versions of Aramaic also led to the creation of the Syriac, Palmyrene and Mandaic alphabets, which formed the basis of the historical scripts of Central Asia, such as the Sogdian and Mongolian alphabets.

The Old Turkic script is generally considered to have its ultimate origins in Aramaic, in particular via the Pahlavi or Sogdian alphabets, as suggested by V. Thomsen, or possibly via Kharosthi (cf., Issyk inscription).

Brahmi script was also possibly derived or inspired by Aramaic. Brahmic family of scripts includes Devanagari.

Languages using the alphabet
Today, Biblical Aramaic, Jewish Neo-Aramaic dialects and the Aramaic language of the Talmud are written in the modern-Hebrew alphabet (distinguished from the Old Hebrew script). In classical Jewish literature, the name given to the modern-Hebrew script was "Ashurit" (the ancient Assyrian script), a script now known widely as the Aramaic script. It is believed that during the period of Assyrian dominion that Aramaic script and language received official status. Syriac and Christian Neo-Aramaic dialects are today written in the Syriac alphabet, which script has superseded the more ancient Assyrian script and now bears its name. Mandaic is written in the Mandaic alphabet. The near-identical nature of the Aramaic and the classical Hebrew alphabets caused Aramaic text to be typeset mostly in the standard Hebrew script in scholarly literature.

Maaloula

In Maaloula, one of few surviving communities in which a Western Aramaic dialect is still spoken, an Aramaic institute was established in 2007 by Damascus University that teaches courses to keep the language alive. The institute's activities were suspended in 2010 amidst fears that the square Aramaic alphabet used in the program too closely resembled the square script of the Hebrew alphabet and all the signs with the square Aramaic script were taken down. The program stated that they would instead use the more distinct Syriac alphabet, although use of the Aramaic alphabet has continued to some degree. Al Jazeera Arabic also broadcast a program about Western Neo-Aramaic and the villages in which it is spoken with the square script still in use.

Letters

Matres lectionis

In Aramaic writing, waw and yodh serve a double function. Originally, they represented only the consonants w and y, but they were later adopted to indicate the long vowels ū and ī respectively as well (often also ō and ē respectively).

Ālap, likewise, has some of the characteristics of a  because in initial positions, it indicates a glottal stop (followed by a vowel), but otherwise, it often also stands for the long vowels ā or ē. Among Jews, the influence of Hebrew often led to the use of Hē instead, at the end of a word.

The practice of using certain letters to hold vowel values spread to Aramaic-derived writing systems, such as in Arabic and Hebrew, which still follow the practice.

Unicode

The Imperial Aramaic alphabet was added to the Unicode Standard in October 2009, with the release of version 5.2.

The Unicode block for Imperial Aramaic is U+10840–U+1085F:

The Syriac Aramaic alphabet was added to the Unicode Standard in September 1999, with the release of version 3.0.

The Syriac Abbreviation (a type of overline) can be represented with a special control character called the Syriac Abbreviation Mark (U+070F). The Unicode block for Syriac Aramaic is U+0700–U+074F:

See also
Syriac alphabet

References

Sources
 Byrne, Ryan. "Middle Aramaic Scripts". Encyclopaedia of Language and Linguistics. Elsevier. (2006)
 Daniels, Peter T., et al. eds. The World's Writing Systems. Oxford. (1996)
 Coulmas, Florian. The Writing Systems of the World. Blackwell Publishers Ltd, Oxford. (1989)
 Rudder, Joshua.  Learn to Write Aramaic: A Step-by-Step Approach to the Historical & Modern Scripts. n.p.: CreateSpace Independent Publishing Platform, 2011. 220 pp. . Includes a wide variety of Aramaic scripts.
 Ancient Hebrew and Aramaic on Coins, reading and transliterating Proto-Hebrew, online edition (Judaea Coin Archive).

External links

 Comparison of Aramaic to related alphabets
 Omniglot entry

 
8th-century BC establishments
Obsolete writing systems
Persian scripts
Right-to-left writing systems
Abjad writing systems